X-Faktor is a Hungarian television music competition to find new singing talent. The eleventh series of the show was broadcast on RTL from 3 September to 19 November 2022. Miller Dávid was the presenter and ByeAlex, Laci Gáspár, Peti Puskás remained in the jury. Adél Csobot left X-Faktor and was replaced by Erika Herceg.

Bernadett Solyom won the season and ByeAlex became the winning mentor for the fourth time in a row.

Auditions
Open auditions took place in Budapest in March 2022. The judges' auditions started on June in Budapest.

Judges' houses
This year, there were no guest speakers, but each mentor listened to the performances of the four categories, but the rules changed: the mentor of a team automatically took two contestants to the live shows, sent two home and dropped two, one of whom went on to another mentor's team. 

The twelve eliminated acts were:
Gáspár's team: Mónika Csuka, Denisa Fülöp, Liza Szalai
ByeAlex's team: Tünde Dankó, LongStoryShort!
Herceg's team: Bucca Brothers, René Krága, Liliána Lakatos, Gréta Nagy
Puskás team: Zsolt Beri "Berry", Márton Miszlai, Anna Kornis

Contestants
Key:
 – Winner
 – Runner-Up
 – Third Place

Results summary 
In season nine, the rule from last season remained, four chairs wear place in the studio, which they can sit for, the mentors want to put forward to the next week, the seats on the chair may change during the show. Based on viewers' votes, another four contestants would be able to enter the next live show.
{|
|-
| – mentored by Erika Herceg 
|| – Danger zone; Safe
|-
| – mentored by ByeAlex 
| – Safe
|-
| – mentored by Peti Puskás
| – Eliminated by SMS vote
|-
| – mentored by Laci Gáspár 
| – Most public votes
|}

Live Shows

Week 1 (22 October)

 – Get a chair, safe and go to the next live show

In the first live show, four chairs are placed, and the juries vote at least three yes, the competitors  sit down. If each was full and another competitor has come, and the juries vote at least again three yes, the competitor with the lowest number of votes in the public vote would hand over the chair.

Week 2 (29 October)

 – Get a chair, safe and go to the next live show

In the second live show, three chairs are placed, and the juries vote at least three yes, the competitors sit down. If each was full and another competitor has come, and the juries vote at least again three yes, the competitor with the lowest number of votes in the public vote would hand over the chair.

Week 3 (5 November)
In the first round, there is only a vote and 1 competitor will be eliminated

 – Get a chair, safe and go to the next live show

In the third live show, two chairs are placed, and the juries vote at least three yes, the competitors sit down. If each was full and another competitor has come, and the juries vote at least again three yes, the competitor with the lowest number of votes in the public vote would hand over the chair.

Week 4 (12 November)

 – Get a chair, safe and go to the next live show

Week 4 changes the rules for the chair. In the event tie between the mentors' votes, the spectators' vote will determine whether or not the competitor is allowed to sit on the chair. In the fourth live show, two chairs are placed again, and the juries vote at least three yes, the competitors  sit down. If each was full and another competitor has come, and the juries vote at least again three yes, the competitor with the lowest number of votes in the public vote would hand over the chair.

Week 5 (19 November)

Ratings

Hungary 11
Television series by Fremantle (company)